Mark XIV or Mark 14, often abbreviated "Mk.", may refer to the 14th version of a product, frequently military hardware. Specifically it can refer to:

Military and weaponry
 Mark XIV bomb sight, developed by the 1942 Royal Air Force
 Mark 14 nuclear bomb, an American experimental thermonuclear weapon
 Mark 14 torpedo, a 1930 US Navy weapon plagued with development problems in World War II
 Mk 14 Enhanced Battle Rifle, an American military selective fire battle rifle
 Mk XIV (type 379), a Supermarine Spitfire variant
 Type 467 Wellington GR Mark XIV, a Vickers Wellington variant
 Martin-Baker Mk 14 NACES ejection seat

Other uses
 Mark 14 and Mark XIV, the fourteenth chapter of the Gospel of Mark in the New Testament of the Christian Bible
 MK14, a 1977 microcomputer kit sold by Science of Cambridge

See also